St Augustine's Catholic School is a co-educational secondary school located in Scarborough, North Yorkshire, England. The school is under the jurisdiction of the Roman Catholic Diocese of Middlesbrough.

Previously a voluntary aided school administered by North Yorkshire County Council, in June 2019 St Augustine's Catholic School converted to academy status. The school is now sponsored by the St Margaret Clitherow Catholic Academy Trust

St Augustine's Catholic School offers GCSEs and Cambridge Nationals as programmes of study for pupils.

References

External links
St Augustine's Catholic School official website

Secondary schools in North Yorkshire
Catholic secondary schools in the Diocese of Middlesbrough
Schools in Scarborough, North Yorkshire
Academies in North Yorkshire